Ozyptila maculosa is a crab spider species found in England.

References

maculosa
Spiders of Europe
Spiders described in 1948